Weining Road is a station on Line 2 of the Shanghai Metro in Changning District.

References

Shanghai Metro stations in Changning District
Line 2, Shanghai Metro
Railway stations in China opened in 2006
Railway stations in Shanghai